Giuseppe Frascarelli ( – 7 January 2014) was an Italian footballer who primarily played as a midfielder. During the 1940s, he captained Ascoli.

Giuseppe Frascarelli died on 7 January 2014, aged 90, in his hometown of Ascoli Piceno, Italy. He was survived by his wife and their three children.

References

1920s births
2014 deaths
Year of birth uncertain
People from Ascoli Piceno
Italian footballers
Association football midfielders
Sportspeople from the Province of Ascoli Piceno
Footballers from Marche